Perinthus or Perinthos was a great and flourishing town of ancient Thrace, situated on the Propontis. According to John Tzetzes, it bore at an early period the name of Mygdonia (Μυγδονία). It lay 22 miles west of Selymbria and 56 miles west of Byzantium, on a small peninsula of the bay which bears its name, and was built like an amphitheatre, on the declivity of a hill. Its site is near modern Marmara Ereğlisi, in Turkey.

History 

It was originally a Samian colony, and, according to George Syncellus, was founded about 599 BC. German archaeologist Theodor Panofka, however, makes it contemporary with Samothrace, that is about 1000 BC. It was particularly renowned for its obstinate defence against Philip II of Macedon. At that time it appears to have been a more important and flourishing town even than Byzantium and being both a harbour and a point at which several main roads met, it was the seat of extensive commerce. This circumstance explains the reason why so many of its coins are still extant from which we learn that large and celebrated festivals were held here.
After the fourth century AD it assumed the name of Heraclea or Heracleia (Ἡράκλεια); which we find sometimes used alone, and sometimes with additions Heraclea Thraciae and Heraclea Perinthus. 

Justinian restored the old imperial palace, and the aqueducts of the city. Coins of Perinthus have also survived, which were studied by Edith Schönert-Geiß.

Cityscape 

The peninsula and acropolis were complemented by the landward lower city and its walls, some remains of which have been found.

Other notable places include the 5th-century basilica which in its architecture seems to be closely linked to the church designs of Constantinople. The floor mosaics are particularly well made and preserved. 
Stone from the basilica seems to have been used in the construction of a tower meant to guard a 1.9m wide secondary gate, from which may be deduced that the basilica must have been destroyed some time prior, though the date for that is not certain. Archaeologists and historians from the Tekirdağ Museum, the University of Istanbul and the University of Heidelberg think the church might have stood for no more than perhaps 150 years. It was never rebuilt and instead replaced with a small chapel.

See also 
 List of ancient Greek cities

References

Samian colonies
Ionian colonies in Thrace
Members of the Delian League
Ancient Greek archaeological sites in Turkey
Archaeological sites in the Aegean Region
Populated places in ancient Thrace
Former populated places in Turkey
History of Tekirdağ Province